is a museum located in Yamanashi prefecture, Japan. Founded in 1981 by former race driver and businessman Nobuo Harada, it has a collection of antique motor vehicles. In 2001 it opened a new area to display a collection of 20th century military aircraft used by Japan, from Japanese Imperial Forces during World War II and the Japan Self-Defense Forces in the postwar period.

Aircraft restorations
Nobuo Harada and his team made a number of trips to former Pacific battlefields and recovered a number of wrecks of Japanese aircraft from World War II. Subsequently, they restored three complete Mitsubishi A6M Zero fighters, and the skeleton of another. One of the complete aircraft is now displayed in the lobby of the Yūshūkan museum adjoining Yasukuni Shrine in Tokyo.

Harada and his team also recovered the damaged rear fuselage of a Mitsubishi G4M Betty bomber of the Imperial Japanese Navy Air Service. The forward fuselage was later built by them from scratch. The museum subsequently restored a Nakajima Ki-43 Hayabusa/Oscar fighter. of the Imperial Japanese Army Air Service

Photography
The museum does not allow photography other than that done by mobile phones.

Aircraft on display
The aircraft on display can vary from year to year.

 61-1127 Curtiss C-46 Commando (Japan Air Self-Defence Force)
 Unknown s/n Grumman S-2F Tracker (United States Navy)
 51-5639 Lockheed T-33A Shooting Star (Japan Air Self-Defence Force)
 26-5007 Lockheed F-104 Starfighter (Japan Air Self-Defence Force)
  91518 Mitsubishi A6M2 Zero Model 21 (Imperial Japanese Navy Air Service)
 1493 Mitsubishi A6M5 Zero Model 52 (Imperial Japanese Navy Air Service)
 12107 Mitsubishi G4M2 Betty (Imperial Japanese Navy Air Service)
 02-7970 North American F-86F Sabre (Japan Air Self-Defence Force)
 02-7960 North American F-86F Sabre (Japan Air Self-Defence Force)
 52-0098 North American T-6G Texan (Japan Air Self-Defence Force)
 51-5639 Sikorsky H-19C Chickasaw (Japan Ground Self-Defence Force)
 12045 Piper L-19B Super Cub (National Safety Force)
 Yokosuka K5Y (replica) (Imperial Japanese Navy Air Service)
 Yokosuka MXY7 Ohka (Imperial Japanese Navy Air Service)
 Wright Flyer (replica)

Gallery

Access
The museum is open every day in August, but closed to the public for the rest of the year. It is accessible by car, and there is also a bus station for an infrequent local community bus across the street from the museum.

See also
List of aerospace museums

References

External links

 Official website

Automobile museums in Japan
History museums in Japan
Aerospace museums in Japan
Military and war museums in Japan
Museums in Yamanashi Prefecture
Museums established in 1981
1981 establishments in Japan
Narusawa, Yamanashi